Mario Mariani (born 6 October 1970) is an Italian pianist, composer, and performer.

Early life and education
Born in Pesaro, Italy, Mario Mariani graduated in Piano at the Conservatorio Gioachino Rossini in 1995.

Career
After creating the experimental band Broz Ensemble, he began to write movie soundtracks for highly appreciated Italian directors and artists, including Vittorio Moroni, Gianluigi Toccafondo and Matteo Pellegrini. He also writes musics for TV advertisings for clients like Microsoft, Toyota, Ferrero, Tele2 and Fiat.

He composed two different editions of the main theme for the prestigious Mostra Internazionale d’Arte Cinematografica of Venice’s Biennale in 1999-2001 and 2005-2007.

Strongly recognizable for his personal and eclectic approach on piano, Mario Mariani imagines his instrument as an orchestra, with a style that goes from contemporary music to theatrical performances, often in collaboration with actors and visual artists like Giuliano Del Sorbo, Massimo Ottoni and Graziella Galvani. He calls his style “transpersonal instantaneous composition”.

In 2008 he won the first prize at Novaracinefestival for Best Soundtrack  with the movie “under my garden” by Andrea Lodovichetti.

In 2010 he brought a grand piano into a cave called “Grotta dei Prosciutti”, on the top of a mountain called Monte Nerone, living there for a whole month and offering one free concert each night.

He created a unique festival named “Teatro Libero del Monte Nerone” (Free theatre of Monte Nerone) that takes place every August since 2011 in the middle of a wood between Marche and Umbria.

With his second piano solo album “Elementalea” (2011) he starts his own label named “Zingaroton”. Mariani played since 2013 Danny Elfman’s scores Beetlejuice and Scissorhands and Bernard Hermanns Psycho score.

Composer

Theatre 
2013 "Amleto" by Pietro Conversano – prod. AMAT Marche
2013 "Encephalon" by Niba, Mario Mariani, Andrea Bartola (prod. Tada')
2010 "La terza vita" by Amandio Pinheiro prod. 50N - Rome
2008 "Tempesta" by Giovanni Ferri prod.ass.culturale Arte/altro
2008 "Il poema dei monti naviganti" with Roberta Biagiarelli, regia. A.Marinuzzi prod. Babelia,CSS Friuli Venezia Giulia, Regione Piemonte
2008 "Il cattivo ladrone" by Leonardo Manera prod. Festival Crucifixus
2004 "Coèfore" di Eschilo regia di M.Conti with Anna Maria Guarnieri prod.Teatro Stabile Marche/Biennale di Venezia/Orestiadi Gibellina
2003 "Il Borghese Gentiluomo" by Molière regia di Giampiero Solari con Giorgio Panariello prod. Teatro Stabile Marche - Teatro Nuovo Milano
2002 "Viaggio nelle muse" da Shakespeare regia di Paola Galassi prod. Teatro Stabile Marche
2002 "Aspetto e spero" di Leonardo Manera regia Paola Galassi prod. Zelig/Bananas
2002 "L’usignolo, non l’allodola" di J.Johnston regia di Paola Galassi prod. Teatro Stabile Marche
2002 "Gusci" da Kafka regia Francesco Calcagnini prod. Accademia Belle Arti - Urbino
2002 "Pantagruele" regia Sante Maurizi prod. La Botte e il Cilindro - Sassari
2001 "Il pasto dell’orco" regia di Fabrizio Bartolucci prod. Teatro Stabile in Rete - TSR
2001 "Dialogo della vecchia gioventù" by Gianni D’Elia regia. F.Calcagnini - Accademia Belle Arti - Urbino
2000 "Crimini esemplari" by Max Aub regia F.Calcagnini prod. Broz Ensemble / Accademia Belle Arti - Urbino
1996 "A dispetto dei santi" regia di F.Calcagnini prod. Accademia Belle Arti - Urbino
1995 "Esercizi spirituali in luogo pubblico" (prod. Incertimomenti)
1994 "Le città invisibili" da Italo Calvino regia F.Calcagnini/S.Maurizi prod. La Botte e il Cilindro - Sassari
1993 "Orazero" (prod. Incertimomenti)

Cinema 
2013 " Se chiudo gli occhi non sono più qui" (100') by Vittorio Moroni – prod. 50N/Rai Cinema
2013  "Italian movies" (90’)  by Matteo Pellegrini – prod. Eagle Pictures
2009  "Eva e Adamo" (90’)  by Vittorio Moroni – prod. 50N
2007  "Le ferie di Licu" (90’) by Vittorio Moroni prod. 50N/Raicinema
2007  "Sotto il mio giardino" (20’) by Andrea Lodovichetti. prod.Centro Sperimentale Cinematografia
2006 "Il matrimonio negato" by Antonio Ciano prod. Nuvola Film
2004 "Tu devi essere il Lupo" (90’) by Vittorio Moroni prod. Metafilm  
2003 "Sulle tracce del gatto" (50’) by Vittorio Moroni e Andrea Caccia prod. Mikado
2002 "Il naso storto" (20’) by Antonio Ciano prod. Nuvola Film
2002 "Da lontano" (8’) by Mauro Santini
2001 "Cainà" by Gennaro Righelli (1922) (65’) film muto
2001 "Di ritorno" (12') by Mauro Santini
2001 "Dietro i vetri" (6’) by Mauro Santini
2001 "Dal cortile" (4') by Mauro Santini
2000 "L’incontro" (52’) Film TV by Vittorio Moroni (Altamarea Film)
2000 "A mille ce n'è" (15') by Paola Bocci (Altamarea Film)
1997 "Tourbillon"(13’) by Matteo Pellegrini (Altamarea Film)
1997 "Girotondo" (5’) by Matteo Pellegrini (Altamarea Film)
1996 "5 aprile" (11’) by Matteo Pellegrini (Altamarea Film)

Silent cinema 
Mario Mariani works intensively and from a long time with silent movies. After his debut in the 90’s with Pesaro’s Mostra Internazionale del Nuovo Cinema within Silent Cinema retrospective, when he plays (always improvising) on David Wark Griffith, Carl Theodor Dreyer, Robert Wiene, Fritz Lang, Friedrich Wilhelm Murnau, George Melies, Dziga Vertov. The only written music is the original soundtrack for the silent Italian movie Caina (1922, Gennaro Righelli).

The “A Silent Christmas”  project is composed by 4 silent movies based on Christmas (A Christmas Carol, A Trap for Santa Claus [1925, by Kleinschmidt], A winter straw ride).
In 2014 he realized the music for piano and organ for “Life and Passion of Jesus” by Ferdinand Zecca.

Animated films 
2013 "Hospice Seragnoli Onlus" (2'38) by Magda Guidi e Mara Cerri
2012 " Tonda's Wonderland" (2’45) by Magda Guidi e Mara Cerri
2009  "7 Sigle per la 45°Mostra Internazionale del Cinema di Pesaro" by M.Santini
2005 "Sigla 62° Mostra del Cinema di Venezia" by F. Ghermandi prod. La Biennale di Venezia
2004 "Unicri" spot sociale ONU di Gianluigi Toccafondo prod.Lanterna Magica
2003 "Cafè l’amour" (10’) by Giorgio Valentini prod. Motus Film
1999-2001  "Sigla Mostra del Cinema di Venezia" by Gianluigi Toccafondo /Biennale Venezia
1999 "Pinocchio" (6’) by Gianluigi Toccafondo (prod. Toccafondo/La Sept Arte)
1999 "Sipario Ducale" (10’) by Gianluigi Toccafondo e Massimo Salvucci
1998 "La Sagra" (2’30) by Roberto Catani
1998 "Errante Erotico Eretico" (1’) by Stefano Franceschetti e Cristiano Carloni
1996 "Bambini e TV" (30’’) by Gianluigi Toccafondo (prod. Mixfilm)
1996 "Prague International Marathon" (30’’) by Gianluigi Toccafondo (Mixfilm)
1996 "On the skin" (50’’) by Mauro Caramanica (prod. Bruno Bozzetto Film)
1996 "Majestic Presence" (50’) by Letizia Geminiani
1995 "Vertigine" (5’45’) by Mauro Caramanica
1994 "La boxe" (27’’) by Gianluigi Toccafondo

Spot TV and commercials 
2011 "Soul Kitchen" for Lube prod. Greenbubble
2004 "Toyota Corolla Verso" prod. Cineteam Rome
2003 "Dixan" agenzia DDB - Milano
2002 "Ferrero Looney Tunes" ag. Pubbliregia
2002 "Parmalat Joy" ag. McCann-Erickson
2002 "Ferrero Rocher" prod. Mercurio Cinematografica
2002 "Libri Repubblica" ag. Lowe Lintas Pirella Gottsche
2001 "Fiat Punto" with Flavio Ibba
2001 "Tele2" ag. Ogilvy
2001 "Microsoft Office XP" prod. McCann- Erickson
2001 "AcmeFilmworks Showreel" (Los Angeles - California)
2000 "Conad" Campagna Natalizia Supermercati
1999 "Stream" Canale Viaggi 2 serie di spot regia G.Toccafondo
1998 "B.P.M" by Matteo Pellegrini (Altamarea Film)
1997 "New Penny" (Max Mara) ag. Boxallaseconda
1997 "Stefanel"30’’ Campagna Stefanel ag. Boxallaseconda

Orchestra, operatic and chamber music 
2010 "Bolero 2.0" per orchestra - commissione Filarmonica Marchigiana
2006 "Il parlatore eterno", opera lirica; prima es. 28 Giugno 2006 Rassegna Lirica Torelliana – Teatro della Fortuna – FANO
2006 "LUZ" per orchestra; prima es. 20 Aprile 2006 Fil. Marchigiana,dir.M.Mariotti
2006 "Die Wolf-Gangsters" for young criminals orchestra – comm.Musicamorfosi
2005 "Il Colombre" per orchestra scolastica – prima es. Teatro Smeraldo Milano,
2003 "A Passo di Gatto " per Banda prima esecuzione: Cartoceto  9 Agosto 2003
1998 Isabella by Azio Corghi, opera – collaborazione e arrangiamento "sezioni Rock"
1998 "The Masterpie®ce" per flauto rinascimentale e quartetto d’archi: prima esecuzione: Boston - New England Conservatory 24 Settembre 1998
1994 "Am I or not a serious composer?" per due flauti prima es.  17 Maggio 1994-Auditorium "La Vela" – Urbino
1993 "Acqui" per pianoforte e 14 strumenti ad acqua prima es. 14 Luglio 1993 Festival Ville e Castella - Frantoio del Trionfo - Saltara

Discography 
2012 "Elementalea" (piano solo) – Ala bianca/Zingaroton
2011 "Intemporanea" (ensemble) Heliopolis Edizioni.
2011 "Utopiano" (Piano solo) Vivirecords CD
2009 "Eva e Adamo" (Colonna sonora) CD Ed. CAM
2007 "Le ferie di Licu" (Colonna sonora) CD Ed. CAM
2005 "Tu devi essere il lupo" (Colonna sonora) CD Ed. CAM
1996 BROZ ENSEMBLE – (compositore e leader) – LM Records CD
1989 CAPILLARY – PTS  (compositore e co-leader) – Minotauro –(vinile; ristampa in CD 1996)

References

External links 

The composer in the cave

Youtube Channel

Italian composers
Italian male composers
1970 births
Living people
Italian male pianists
21st-century pianists
21st-century Italian male musicians